Waterston is a village near Milford Haven in Pembrokeshire, south Wales.

Waterston may also refer to:

 Waterston House, the headquarters of the Scottish Ornithologists' Club in Aberlady, East Lothian, Scotland
 Waterston Manor, a 17th-century manor house in Puddletown, Dorset, England

People with the surname
 Alisse Waterston (born 1951), American cultural anthropologist
 Andrew Rodger Waterston (1912-1996) Scottish zoologist and son of James Waterston (entomologist)
 Anna Cabot Lowell Quincy Waterston (1812–1899), American writer
 Archie Waterston (1902–1982), Scottish footballer from the 1920s and 1930s
 Darren Waterston (born 1965), American painter
 George Waterston (1911–1980), Scottish ornithologist and conservationist
 James Waterston (born 1969), American actor and son of Sam Waterston
 James Waterston (entomologist) (1879-1930) Scottish entomologist and Presbyterian minister
 Jane Elizabeth Waterston (1843–1932), Scottish teacher
 John James Waterston (1811–1883), Scottish physicist
 Katherine Waterston (born 1980), American actress and daughter of Sam Waterston
 Sam Waterston (born 1940), American actor, producer and director